Nalbach is a municipality in the district of Saarlouis, in Saarland, Germany. It is situated approximately 8 km northeast of Saarlouis, and 20 km northwest of Saarbrücken.

References

Saarlouis (district)